Felix Schiller (born 6 December 1989) is a German former professional footballer who played as a defender.

Career
Born in Berlin, Schiller made his professional debut for SV Werder Bremen II during the 2008–09 3. Liga season as a substitute for Finn Holsing in a 1–1 home draw with Dynamo Dresden.

In the summer of 2011, Schiller moved to Rot-Weiß Oberhausen in the 3. Liga.

After a stint at Rot-Weiß Oberhausen where was a first-team regular, Schiller joined Regionalliga Nordost side 1. FC Magdeburg during the 2012–13 season.

In September 2018, Schiller missed three matches due to knee problems. On 23 January 2019, it was reported his knee injury required surgery. A week later Schiller announced his immediate retirement at the age of 29. He agreed the termination of his contract with VfL Osnabrück.

Personal life
Following his retirement from football, Schiller studied to become a teacher.

References

External links
 
 

1989 births
Living people
Footballers from Berlin
German footballers
Association football defenders
3. Liga players
Regionalliga players
SV Werder Bremen II players
Rot-Weiß Oberhausen players
1. FC Magdeburg players
VfL Osnabrück players